First finger is an ambiguous term in English language due to two competing finger numbering systems used. It might refer to either the thumb or the index finger depending on the context.

It usually refers to the thumb in a medical context, 
or in a musical context when referring to keyboard instruments, like piano.

It usually refers to the index finger (the finger next to the thumb) in common English, or in a musical context when referring to string instruments, like guitar, or wind instruments, like flute.

See also
Fingers
First finger, second finger, third finger, fourth finger, fifth finger
Thumb, index finger, middle finger, ring finger, little finger
Fingering (music)

References

Fingers